Nikolsky is a rural locality (a village) in Birsk, Birsky District, Bashkortostan, Russia. The population was 85 as of 2010. There are 2 streets.

Geography 
It is located on the Belaya River.

References 

Rural localities in Birsky District